Calello is a surname. Notable people with the surname include:

Adrián Calello (born 1987), Argentine footballer
Carola Calello (born 1977), Argentine alpine skier
Charles Calello (born 1938), American singer, composer, conductor, arranger, and record producer
Guadalupe Calello (born 1990), Argentine footballer
Paul Calello (1961–2010), American chief executive